Elf Cup may refer to:

Fungi
Sarcoscypha coccinea, a fungus also known as the "scarlet elf cup"
Geopyxis carbonaria,  a fungus also known as the "charcoal loving elf-cup"
Helvella leucomelaena, a fungus commonly known as the "white-footed elf cup"

Other
 Elf Cup, a character of Toad Patrol
 ELF Cup, an international football tournament organized by Northern Cyprus Football Federation (KTFF)

See also
Fairy Cup (disambiguation)
Pixie cup